Xtra Vancouver, formerly Xtra! West, was a gay bi-weekly newspaper, published by Pink Triangle Press in Vancouver, British Columbia, Canada.

Printed on newsprint in tabloid format from its establishment in 1993, Pink Triangle Press announced on January 14, 2015 that the paper edition will be discontinued and the publication will continue in an exclusively digital media format.

Its offices were located in the Davie Village neighbourhood, Vancouver's gay village. The publication's original editor and publisher was Daniel Gawthrop. 
In March 2010, Xtra! West was rebranded Xtra Vancouver with the launch of a redesign in the Toronto, Ottawa and Vancouver markets.

The publication's final print edition was published on February 12, 2015.

See also
Xtra Magazine, a continuation of Xtra!, Xtra Ottawa and Xtra Vancouver.
List of newspapers in Canada

References

1993 establishments in British Columbia
2015 disestablishments in British Columbia
Biweekly newspapers published in Canada
Defunct newspapers published in British Columbia
LGBT culture in Vancouver
LGBT-related newspapers published in Canada
Newspapers published in Vancouver
Publications established in 1993
Publications disestablished in 2015
Online newspapers with defunct print editions
1990s LGBT literature
2000s LGBT literature
2010s LGBT literature
LGBT literature in Canada